The North Fork Umatilla Wilderness is a wilderness area located inside the Umatilla National Forest, in the Blue Mountains of northeastern Oregon.  It is the smallest wilderness in northeast Oregon, encompassing only  in Umatilla and Union counties.

Topography
Common vegetation includes juniper, sagebrush, ponderosa pine, fir, spruce, lodgepole pine, and western larch.

Wildlife
The North Fork Umatilla River supports a sizeable population of bull trout, as well as anadromous fish such as steelhead.  There are also several streams within the wilderness that contain native trout, and a few streams support spawning steelhead.  Big game animals found in the wilderness include Rocky Mountain elk and deer.  Other wildlife in the wilderness include blue and ruffed grouse.

Recreation
Primary recreational activities in the North Fork Umatilla Wilderness include hiking, camping, hunting, fishing, and horseback riding.  The North Fork of the Umatilla River is designated catch and release only.  There is a  hiking trail system, which opens up early in the season due to the low elevation of the Wilderness.

See also
 List of Oregon Wildernesses
 List of U.S. Wilderness Areas
 Wilderness Act of 1964

References

External links

 Umatilla National Forest - North Fork Umatilla Wilderness - US Forest Service
 North Fork Umatilla Wilderness - Wilderness.net

Wilderness areas of Oregon
Protected areas of Umatilla County, Oregon
Protected areas of Union County, Oregon
Umatilla National Forest
1984 establishments in Oregon
Protected areas established in 1984